Steve Berman is an American editor, novelist and short story writer. He writes in the field of queer speculative fiction.

Biography
Berman was born on August 28 in Philadelphia, Pennsylvania, and raised in southern New Jersey.  Berman realized in junior high school he was gay. He attended Tulane University, earning a bachelor's degree in English Literature, then later studied History at Rutgers–Camden campus in Camden, New Jersey as well as a master's degree in Liberal Studies in 2006. He began his publishing career working in pharmaceutical and medical publishing, then worked as a senior book buyer for wholesaler Bookazine, and served in the marketing department of a small Jewish press. He spent a decade as an employee engagement survey analyst for a human resources consulting firm in Cherry Hill, New Jersey. Berman attended the Clarion East 2006 class, the last year that workshop was held in East Lansing, Michigan. Though raised Jewish, Berman wavers between Jewish secularism and Atheism.

Berman is a former member of Science Fiction and Fantasy Writers of America (SFWA) and a lifetime member of the RPGA. His short fiction is mainly dark fantasy, horror, urban fantasy, and weird autofiction. He has spoken online and at convention panels on the history of LGBT-inclusive speculative fiction and on LGBT young adult topics. In 2001, Berman founded Lethe Press. The first few titles included his first short story collection, Trysts, and several books in the public domain. In 2004, he met author Toby Johnson and offered to reprint Johnson's book, Gay Spirituality. Lethe Press regularly publishes title of LGBT speculative fiction.

Several of his urban fantasy stories are set in the Fallen Area. In June 2009, he launched the quarterly publication, Icarus, the Magazine of Gay Speculative Fiction, which ended in October 2013.

In August 2017, Berman moved to Western Massachusetts.

Awards and honors
Berman has been a finalist for the Shirley Jackson Award, the Golden Crown Literary Award(1), a seven-time finalist for the Gaylactic Spectrum Awards and five-time finalist (as editor) for the Lambda Literary Award in various categories. He won the latter in 2018 for His Seed. His first novel, Vintage: A Ghost Story released in 2007 and was a finalist for the Andre Norton Award.

As editor
Charmed Lives: Gay Spirit in Storytelling (co-edited with Toby Johnson) (2006). The inaugural title in the White Crane Wisdom Series, this anthology of inspirational essays and short fiction for gay men was a finalist for a Lambda Literary Award.
So Fey: Queer Fairy Fiction (2007, Reprinted 2009). This is an anthology of LGBT short fiction dealing with faeries was a finalist for the Gaylactic Spectrum Awards and the Golden Crown Literary Awards.
Magic in the Mirrorstone (2008). This is an anthology of young adult fiction, all stories dealing with magic.
Best Gay Stories (2008–10, 2013-6). An annual anthology reprinting quality short fiction and essays that have gay themes. Canadian author Peter Dube took over editorial duties for the 2011 and 2012 volumes. 
Wilde Stories (2008–18). An annual anthology offers reprints of the prior year's best works of speculative and interstitial fiction with gay characters and themes - the 2008 and 2010 editions were finalists for a Lambda Literary Award.
Speaking Out (2011). A young adult anthology of inspirational short fiction aimed at LGBT teens.
Boys of Summer (2012). A young adult anthology of summer-themed short fiction aimed at gay teens.
Heiresses of Russ (2011–16). An annual anthology of lesbian-themed speculative fiction (each volume is co-edited with a different female editor) named in honor after Joanna Russ. The 2012 volume was a finalist for the Lambda Literary Award and the Golden Crown Literary Award.
The Touch of the Sea (2012). An anthology of gay-themed fantastical stories involving the sea and maritime folklore.
Bad Seeds: Evil Progeny (2013). A horror anthology of stories about evil children from Prime Books.
Where Thy Dark Eye Glances: Queering Edgar Allan Poe (2013). A dark fantasy anthology that remixes the oeuvre of Poe through a queer perspective. A finalist for the Shirley Jackson Award.
Zombies: Shambling Through the Ages (2013). An anthology of historical stories featuring ghouls and zombies from Prime Books.
Shades of Blue & Gray: Civil War Ghost Stories (2013). An anthology of ghost stories set during or based on the consequences of the American Civil War.
Suffered From the Night: Queering Bram Stoker's Dracula (2013). A dark fantasy and horror anthology that offers new gay-themed stories about characters from the most famous vampire novel of all time.
Handsome Devil: Stories of Sin and Seduction (2014). An anthology of incubus-themed horror and dark fantasy tales from Prime Books.
Daughters of Frankenstein: Lesbian Mad Scientists (2015). A science-fiction lesbian-themed anthology, a finalist for the Golden Crown Literary Award.
His Seed (2017). Winner for the Lambda Literary Award.
Burly Tales (2021). An anthology of fairy-tale retellings for hirsute gay men.

References

External links
Steve Berman website
20 Questions with Steve Berman (Interview)
Norton Award Interview
Interview with Steve Berman on Tor.com
A Conversation with Steve Berman on Chelsea Station Magazine

Steve Berman at RPGgeek

21st-century American male writers
21st-century American novelists
American agnostics
American fantasy writers
American male novelists
American male short story writers
American short story writers
American gay writers
Jewish agnostics
Jewish American writers
Lambda Literary Award winners
LGBT Jews
American LGBT novelists
LGBT people from Pennsylvania
Living people
Role-playing game designers
Rutgers University alumni
Tulane University alumni
Year of birth missing (living people)